= 2017 Academy Awards =

2017 Academy Awards may refer to:

- 89th Academy Awards, the Academy Awards ceremony that took place in 2017, honoring the best in film for 2016
- 90th Academy Awards, the Academy Awards ceremony that took place in 2018, honoring the best in film for 2017
